Buddleja (or Buddleia) species are used as food plants by the larvae (caterpillars) of a number of Lepidoptera species, including the following.

Arctiidae 
Argina argus – India

Cossidae 
Coryphodema tristis – recorded on Buddleja madagascariensis in South Africa

Ethmiidae 
Pyramidobela angelarum – Nearctic

Hesperiidae 
Indian awlking (Choaspes benjaminii) – India

Lycaenidae 
Holly blue or hill hedge blue (Celastrina argiolus) – recorded on Buddleja davidii in India

Noctuidae

Mullein (Cucullia verbasci) – Palaearctic
Episteme maculatrix – India
Mentaxya muscosa – recorded on Buddleja polystachya in East Africa
The gothic (Naenia typica) – UK
Opsigalea ocellata – recorded on Buddleja sessiliflora in the Nearctic and Mexico

Nymphalidae 
Charaxes sp. – recorded on Buddleja davidii in East Africa
Variable checkerspot (Euphydryas chalcedona) – recorded on B. davidii in the Nearctic
High brown fritillary (Argynnis adippe)

Pieridae 
Redbase Jezebel (Delias pasithoe) – India

Pterophoridae 
Oidaematophorus lienigianus – Nearctic

Pyralidae 
Pagyda salvalis – East Africa
Pionea ablactalis – recorded on Buddleja polystachya in East Africa

Sphingidae 
Death's-head hawkmoth or bee robber (Acherontia lachesis) – recorded on Buddleja asiatica in Taiwan, and on Buddleja officinalis in Yunnan Province, China.
Aellopos tantalus – recorded on Buddleja davidii in Brazil
Coelonia fulvinotata – recorded on B. davidii in East Africa
Enyo ocypete – recorded on B. davidii in Brazil

Tortricidae 

Argyrotaenia citrana – Nearctic
Light brown apple moth (Epiphyas postvittana) – recorded on Buddleja davidii in Europe

Zygaenidae 
Erasmia pulchella – India
Eterusia aedea – India
Histia flabellicornis – India

External links

Buddleja
+Lepidoptera